The Finnish Steam Locomotive Class A5 was a class of two locomotives, being the first class of locomotive manufactured in Finland. These first Finnish locomotives were production experiments, which allowed the State Railways to investigate the construction methods of locomotives. The State Railways locomotives ordered the construction of a workshop in Helsinki in 1868, at the same time 10 passenger locomotives were ordered from Great Britain for the St. Petersburg railway line (see Finnish Steam Locomotive Class C1). As a result, the locomotives produced in the Helsinki workshop were similar to those produced in Great Britain.

The British produced locomotives were built in 1869 while the first Finnish Locomotives were constructed in 1874 and 1875. The British locomotives set the design characteristics of the Finnish A3, A5  locomotives. The price of the domestically produced Finnish locomotives was almost 50% higher than the imported locomotives.

A5 No. 58 is preserved at the Finnish Railway Museum Until the 1920s it pulled passenger trains in southern Finland. In its last few years of operation it was also used for shunting. A5 locomotives were nicknamed "Lankkihattu" because they were similar to the A6 locomotives, which were had with brass steam domes.

See also

 Finnish Railway Museum
 Heritage railways
 History of rail transport in Finland
 Jokioinen Museum Railway
 List of Finnish locomotives
 List of heritage railways
 List of railway museums Worldwide
 Restored trains
 VR Group

References

External links
Finnish Railway Museum
Steam Locomotives in Finland Including the Finnish Railway Museum

VR locomotives
A5
5 ft gauge locomotives
Railway locomotives introduced in 1874
4-4-0 locomotives